Nawanshahr Assembly constituency (Sl. No.: 47) is a Punjab Legislative Assembly constituency in Shaheed Bhagat Singh Nagar district, Punjab state, India.

Vidhan Sabha Members
 1972 : Dilbagh Singh (Indian National Congress)
 1977 : Jatinder Singh (Shiromani Akali Dal) 
 1980 : Dilbagh Singh, IND
 1985 : Dilbagh Singh, INC	
 1992 : Dilbagh Singh, INC	
 1997 : Charanjit Singh (Independent) 
 2002 : Parkash Singh, INC

Election results

2022 
 

 

 

-->

2017

1972
 Dilbagh Singh (INC) : 35,290 votes 
 Amar Chand (IND) : 15,996

References

External links
  

Assembly constituencies of Punjab, India
Shaheed Bhagat Singh Nagar district